The 1983 Atlantic Conference Baseball Championship Series was held on May 6 and 7, 1983 to determine the champion of the NCAA Division I the Atlantic 10 Conference, for the 1983 NCAA Division I baseball season.  The conference rechristened itself for the 1983 season, recognizing membership changes.  This was the fifth iteration of the event, and was held at Beaver Field on the campus of Penn State in State College, Pennsylvania.   won the championship two games to none and earned the conference's automatic bid to the 1983 NCAA Division I baseball tournament.

Format and seeding
The regular season winners of each of the conference's two divisions advanced to a best of three series.

Results
Game One

Game Two

References

Tournament
Atlantic 10 Conference Baseball Tournament
Atlantic 10 Conference baseball tournament
Atlantic 10 Conference baseball tournament
Baseball in Pennsylvania
College sports in Pennsylvania
Sports competitions in Pennsylvania
Sports in State College, Pennsylvania
Tourist attractions in Centre County, Pennsylvania